Mazibuko is a South African surname that may refer to:

Abednego Mazibuko, South African singer
Albert Mazibuko, South African singer, brother of Abednego
Clement Mazibuko (born 1977), South African football midfielder 
Fusi Mazibuko (born 1980), South African basketball player 
Gcina Mazibuko (born 1983), Swaziland football striker 
Goodman Mazibuko (born 1975), South African football midfielder
Lindiwe Mazibuko (born 1980), South African politician and musician 
Seth Mazibuko, South African anti-apartheid activists 
Vusumuzi Mazibuko (born 1984), South African cricketer